The 1967 Memorial Cup was the 49th annual Memorial Cup competition, organized by the Canadian Amateur Hockey Association (CAHA) to determine the champion of junior A ice hockey.  The George Richardson Memorial Trophy champions Toronto Marlboros of the Ontario Hockey Association in Eastern Canada competed against the Abbott Cup champions Port Arthur Marrs of the Thunder Bay Junior Hockey League in Western Canada. In a best-of-seven series, held at Fort William Gardens in Fort William, Ontario, Toronto won their fifth Memorial Cup, defeating Port Arthur 4 games to 1.

Scores
Game 1: Toronto 6-3 Port Arthur
Game 2: Toronto 8-4 Port Arthur
Game 3: Port Arthur 6-4 Toronto
Game 4: Toronto 6-0 Port Arthur
Game 5: Toronto 6-3 Port Arthur

Winning roster
Doug Acomb, Fred Barrett, Richie Bayes, Jim Blain, Mike Byers, Terry Caffrey, Cam Crosby, Gord Davies, Gary Edwards, Chris Evans, Brian Glennie, Frank Hamill, Ken Kelly, Steve King, Tom Martin, Gerry Meehan, Cam Newton, Al Osborne, Brad Park, Mike Pelyk, Bob Whidden, John Wright. Coach: Gus Bodnar

National playoffs

Additional Interleague Playdowns
Moncton Seals defeated Fredericton Red Wings 3-games-to-2 (New Brunswick Final) 
Halifax Canadiens defeated North Sydney Victorias 4-games-to-0 (Nova Scotia Final)
Halifax Canadiens defeated Moncton Seals 4-games-to-1 (Atlantic Canada Final)
Verdun Maple Leafs defeated Dolbeau Castors 3-games-to-2 (Quebec SF)
Thetford Mines Canadiens defeated Verdun Maple Leafs 3-games-to-1 (Quebec Final)
New Westminster Royals defeated Trail Smoke Eaters 3-games-to-0 (British Columbia Semi Final)
New Westminster Royals defeated Penticton Broncos 4-games-to-0 (British Columbia Final)

Roll of League Champions

Western Canada - Abbott Cup playdowns
British Columbia (BC)
PCJHL: New Westminster Royals
KIHL: Trail Smoke Eaters
OJHL: Penticton Broncos
Alberta (AB)
AJHL: Edmonton Movers
Saskatchewan (SK)
SJHL: Saskatoon Macs
Manitoba (MB)
MJHL: Flin Flon Bombers
Northwestern Ontario (NWO)
TBJHL: Port Arthur Marrs
NWOJHL: Geraldton Goldminers

Eastern Canada - George Richardson Memorial Trophy playdowns
Ontario (ON)
Eastern Ontario (EO) - CJHL: Cornwall Royals
Northeastern Ontario (NEO) - NOJHA: Sault Ste. Marie Greyhounds
Southern Ontario (SO) - OHA: Toronto Marlboros
Quebec (QC)
LHJP: Thetford Mines Canadiens
LHJSLS: Dolbeau Castors
LHJMM: Verdun Maple Leafs
Atlantic Canada (AC)
Cape Breton - CBJHL: North Sydney Victorias
New Brunswick - Moncton Seals (Independent)
Nova Scotia - Halifax Canadiens (Independent)

References

External links
 Memorial Cup 
 Canadian Hockey League

Mem
Memorial Cup tournaments